Debra Tolchinsky is a filmmaker, an associate chair and associate professor of radio, TV, and film at Northwestern University, and founding director of Northwestern University's MFA program in documentary media. Tolchinsky is most known for her true-crime documentary short published by The New York Times that explores the story of Penny Beerntsen and Steven Avery, which is at the center of Netflix's series Making A Murderer.

Early life and education
Tolchinsky grew up in Los Angeles, California. She earned a BA and MFA at the Art Institute of Chicago.

Career
Tolchinsky is the founding director of Northwestern University’s MFA program in documentary media and is the associate chair and associate professor of radio, TV, and film. She co-founded the Chicago chapter of Film Fatales, an organization that supports women directors based in Chicago. She has shown her films at the Sundance Film Festival, the John F. Kennedy Center, the Gene Siskel Film Center, and the Supreme Court Institute.

Films

Contaminated Memories 
Tolchinsky's most widely-known work is true-crime documentary Contaminated Memories, published by The New York Times. The 13-minute film follows Penny Beerntsen, who returns to where her assault took place and recounts the attack that led her to mistakenly identify Steven Avery as the perpetrator. Beerntsen and Avery's story is documented in Netflix's series Making A Murderer. Tolchinsky worked closely with Beerntsen in the making of the film to share her story. The film primarily explores memory contamination, or the ability for a memory to be corrupted by external factors so that facts are difficult to parse out. The film cites cognitive scientists like Elizabeth Loftus.

Awards
Tolchinsky's film, Fast Talk, which she directed and produced, won Best Documentary at the LA Femme International Film Festival and Best Documentary Feature at the Chagrin Documentary Film Festival.

References

External links

American film producers
American women film producers
American women film directors
Film directors from California
Film producers from California
American women academics
Living people
People from Los Angeles
Year of birth missing (living people)
School of the Art Institute of Chicago alumni
Northwestern University faculty
21st-century American women